A grassroots movement is one that uses the people in a given district, region or community as the basis for a political or economic movement. Grassroots movements and organizations use collective action from the local level to affect change at the local, regional, national or international level. Grassroots movements are associated with bottom-up, rather than top-down decision-making, and are sometimes considered more natural or spontaneous than more traditional power structures.

Grassroots movements, using self-organization, encourage community members to contribute by taking responsibility and action for their community. Grassroots movements utilize a variety of strategies from fundraising and registering voters, to simply encouraging political conversation. Goals of specific movements vary and change, but the movements are consistent in their focus on increasing mass participation in politics. These political movements may begin as small and at the local level, but grassroots politics as Cornel West contends are necessary in shaping progressive politics as they bring public attention to regional political concerns.

The idea of grassroots is often conflated with participatory democracy. The Port Huron Statement, a manifesto seeking a more democratic society, says that to create a more equitable society, "the grass roots of American Society" need to be the basis of civil rights and economic reform movements. The terms can be distinguished in that grassroots often refers to a specific movement or organization, whereas participatory democracy refers to the larger system of governance.

History 
The earliest origins  of "grass roots" as a political metaphor are obscure. In the United States, an early use of the phrase "grassroots and boots" was thought to have been coined by Senator Albert Jeremiah Beveridge of Indiana, who said of the Progressive Party in 1912, "This party has come from the grass roots. It has grown from the soil of people's hard necessities".

In a 1907 newspaper article about Ed Perry, vice-chairman of the Oklahoma state committee, the phrase was used as follows: "In regard to his political views Mr. Perry has issued the following terse platform: 'I am for a square deal, grass root representation, for keeping close to the people, against ring rule and for fair treatment.'" A 1904 news article on a campaign for possible Theodore Roosevelt running mate Eli Torrance quotes a Kansas political organizer as saying: "Roosevelt and Torrance clubs will be organized in every locality. We will begin at the grass roots".

Since the early 1900s, grassroots movements have been widespread both in the United States and in other countries. Major examples include parts of the American Civil Rights Movement of the 1950s and 1960s, Brazil's land equity movement of the 1970s and beyond, the Chinese rural democracy movement of the 1980s and the German peace movement of the 1980s.

A particular instantiation of grassroots politics in the American Civil Rights Movement was the 1951 case of William Van Til working on the integration of the Nashville Public Schools. Van Til worked to create a grassroots movement focused on discussing race relations at the local level. To that end, he founded the Nashville Community Relations Conference, which brought together leaders from various communities in Nashville to discuss the possibility of integration. In response to his attempts to network with leadership in the black community, residents of Nashville responded with violence and scare tactics. However, Van Til was still able to bring blacks and whites together to discuss the potential for changing race relations, and he was ultimately instrumental in integrating the Peabody College of Education in Nashville. Furthermore, the desegregation plan proposed by Van Til's Conference was implemented by Nashville schools in 1957. This movement is characterized as grassroots because it focused on changing a norm at the local level using local power. Van Til worked with local organizations to foster political dialogue and was ultimately successful.

The Brazilian Landless Workers Movement (MST) was founded in the 1970s and has grown into an international organization. The MST focused on organizing young farmers and their children in fighting for a variety of rights, most notably the right to access land. The movement sought organic leaders and used strategies of direct action such as land occupations. It largely maintained autonomy from the Brazilian government. The MST traces its roots to discontent arising from large land inequalities in Brazil in the 1960s. Such discontent gained traction, particularly after Brazil became a democracy in 1985. The movement focused especially on occupying land that was considered unproductive, thus showing that it was seeking overall social benefit. In the 1990s the influence of the MST grew tremendously following two mass killings of protestors. Successful protests were those in which the families of those occupying properties receiving plots of land. It is worth noting that although the grassroots efforts of the MST were successful in Brazil when they were tried by the South African Landless People's Movement (LPM) in 2001 they were not nearly as successful. Land occupations in South Africa were politically contentious and did not achieve the positive results seen by the MST.

The National People's Congress was a grassroots democratic reform movement that came out of the existing Chinese government in 1987. It encouraged grassroots elections in villages all around China with the express purpose of bringing democracy to the local level of government. Reforms took the form of self-governing village committees that were elected in a competitive, democratic process. Xu Wang from Princeton University called the Congress mutually empowering for the state and the peasantry in that the state was given a renewed level of legitimacy by the democratic reforms and the peasantry was given far more political power. This manifested itself in increased voting rate, particularly for the poor, and increased levels of political awareness according to Wang's research. One example of the increased accountability from the new institutions was a province in which villagers gave 99,000 suggestions to the local government. Ultimately, 78,000 of these were adopted indicating a high rate of governmental responsiveness. This movement is considered grassroots because it focuses on systematically empowering the people. This focus manifested itself in the democratic institutions that focused on engaging the poor and in reform efforts that sought to make the government more responsive to the will of the people.

Another instance of a historical grassroots movement was the 1980s German peace movement. The movement traces its roots to the 1950s movement opposing nuclear armament or the "Ban the Bomb" Movement. In the 1980s, the movement became far bigger. In 1981, 800 organizations pushed the government to reduce the military size. The push culminated in a protest by 300,000 people in the German capital Bonn. The movement was successful in producing a grassroots organization, the Coordination Committee, which directed the efforts of the peace movements in the following years. The committee ultimately failed to decrease the size of the German military, but it laid the groundwork for protests of the Iraq war in the 2000s. Further, the movement started public dialogue about policy directed at peace and security. Like the Civil Rights Movement, the German Peace movement is considered grassroots because it focused on political change starting at the local level.

Another example of grassroots in the 1980s was the Citizens Clearinghouse for Natural Waste, an organization that united communities and various grassroots groups in America in support of more environmentally friendly methods of dealing with natural waste. The movement focused especially on African American communities and other minorities. It sought to bring awareness to those communities and alter the focus from moving problematic waste to changing the system that produced such waste. The movement is considered grassroots because it utilized strategies that derived their power from the affected communities. For example, in North Carolina, African American communities lay down in front of dump trucks to protest their environmental impact. The success of these movements largely remains to be seen.

Strategies of grassroots movements 

Grassroots movements use tactics that build power from local and community movements. Grassroots Campaigns, a non-profit organization dedicated to creating and supporting grassroots movements in America says that grassroots movements aim to raise money, build organizations, raise awareness, build name recognition, to win campaigns and to deepen political participation. Grassroots movements work toward these and other goals via strategies focusing on local participation in either local or national politics.

Grassroots organizations derive their power from the people, thus their strategies seek to engage ordinary people in political discourse to the greatest extent possible. Below is a list of strategies considered to be grassroots because of their focus on engaging the populace.
 Hosting house meetings or parties
 Having larger meetings—AGMs
 Putting up posters
 Talking with pedestrians on the street or walking door-to-door (often involving informational clipboards)
 Gathering signatures for petitions
 Mobilizing letter-writing, phone-calling and emailing campaigns
 Setting up information tables
 Raising money from many small donors for political advertising or campaigns
 Organizing large demonstrations
 Asking individuals to submit opinions to media outlets and government officials
 Holding get out the vote activities, which include the practices of reminding people to vote and transporting them to polling places.

Use of online social networks 
Social media's prominence in political and social activism has skyrocketed in the last decade. Influencers on apps like Instagram and Twitter have all become hot spots for growing grassroots movements as platforms to inform, excite and organize.

Hashtags 
Another influential way media is used to organize is through the use of hashtags to group together postings from across the network under a unifying message. Some hashtags that stirred up larger media coverage include the #MeToo movement, started in 2017 in response to sexual assault allegations against prominent figures in the American entertainment industry. Grassroots movements also use hashtags to organize on a large scale on social media. Some examples include:

BlackLivesMatter, this hashtag demonstrates how what starts as a media campaign can take footing to be a form of embodying an entire movement.
 LoveWins. After the Supreme Court of the United States ruled in favor of legalizing same-sex marriage, supporters used the hashtag #LoveWins.
 Resist: This hashtag, used in cities throughout America, is another example of the power of organization through media platforms. It was used by event planning sites like Meetup.com to bring together members of a community who wanted to get involved politically. It was used in the case of #Resist:Dallas for such purposes.
Grassroots activism partnered with social media may be shaping the way in which citizens organize, engage and protest in an intensely digital age.
 EnoughIsEnough: originating from survivors of the Parkland school shooting in Florida, U.S., this hashtag calls for political action to prevent shootings.

Examples

Barry Goldwater 1964 presidential campaign

The junior senator from Arizona and standard-bearer of conservative Republicans, Barry Goldwater announced his candidacy on January 3, 1964. Goldwater focused on goals such as reducing the size of the federal government, lowering taxes, promoting free enterprise and a strong commitment to U.S. global leadership and fighting communism; which appealed strongly to conservatives in the Republican Party.

Despite vehement opposition from the leaders of his party's dominant moderate-liberal wing, such as New York governor Nelson Rockefeller and Michigan governor George Romney; Goldwater secured the Republican nomination. He sparked a grassroots movement among young conservatives by presenting himself as honest, committed and a genuine politician. The majority of his campaign donations were made by individual supporters; and only one-third of donations were greater than $500.

Bernie Sanders 2016 presidential campaign 

The junior United States senator and former Representative from Vermont, Bernie Sanders, formally announced his 2016 presidential campaign on May 26, 2015 on the foundation of reversing "obscene levels" of income and wealth inequality. Sanders stated that he would run an issue-oriented and positive campaign, focusing his efforts on getting corporate money out of politics, raising taxes on the wealthy, guaranteeing tuition-free higher education, incorporating a single-payer healthcare system, fighting against climate change and other key issues.

Sanders didn't have the resources to run a massive presidential campaign across the United States, so he utilized passionate volunteer organizers across the nation to build the movement. Millions inspired by Sanders were able to elevate the campaign to challenge the Democratic front-runner, former Secretary of State Hillary Clinton, before ultimately losing. Sanders used his grassroots campaign to receive more than 7 million individual contributions averaging $27, effectively breaking Barack Obama's previous individual contribution record in 2008.

UK grassroots aid movement 
In 2015 the refugee crisis became front-page news across the world. Affected by images of the plight of refugees arriving and travelling across Europe, the grassroots aid movement (otherwise known as the people-to-people or people solidarity movement), consisting of thousands of private individuals with no prior NGO experience, began in earnest to self-organise and form groups taking aid to areas of displaced persons. The first wave of early responders reached camps in Calais and Dunkirk in August 2015 and joined forces with existing local charities supporting the inhabitants there. Other volunteers journeyed to support refugees across the Balkans, Macedonia and the Greek islands. Grassroots aid filled voids and saved lives by plugging gaps in the system between governments and existing charities.

The Axis of Justice 
The Axis of Justice (AofJ) is a not-for-profit group co-founded by Tom Morello and Serj Tankian. Its intended purpose is to promote social justice by connecting musicians and music enthusiasts to progressive grassroots ideals. The group appears at music festivals; the most prominent being Lollapalooza in 2003. The Axis of Justice most regularly appears whenever the bands System of a Down or Audioslave are performing. The group also has a podcast on XM Satellite radio and KPFK (90.7 FM), a Pacifica Radio station in Los Angeles, California. The AofJ's mission is to connect local music fans to organizations, local and global, aimed at effectively working on issues like peace, human rights and economic justice within communities.

Criticism

Issues with horizontal movements 
Grassroots movements are usually criticized because the recent rise in social media has resulted in leaderless and horizontal movements. Some argue that social movements without a clear hierarchy are far less effective and are more likely to die off.

Astroturfing 

Astroturfing refers to political action that is meant to appear to be grassroots, that is spontaneous and local, but in fact comes from an outside organization, such as a corporation or think tank. It is named after AstroTurf, a brand of artificial grass.
An example of astroturfing was the ExxonMobil Corporation's push to disseminate false information about climate change. ExxonMobil was largely successful both in disseminating the information through think tanks and in disguising the true nature of the think tanks.

More controversial examples of astroturfing often exhibit some characteristics of a real grassroots organization, but also characteristics of astroturf. Many of President Obama's efforts, for example, have been deemed grassroots because of their focus on involving the electorate at large. Critics of Obama have argued that some of these methods are in fact astroturfing because they believe that Obama faked the grassroots support. For example, the Reason Foundation has accused Obama of planting astroturf supporters in town hall meetings. Many movements and organizations must be placed on a continuum between grassroots and astroturf instead of labeled entirely as one or the other. For example, Australia's Convoy of No Confidence, a movement seeking to force an early election in 2011, incorporated elements of grassroots infrastructure in its reliance on the anger and discontentment of the participants. It also had elements of astroturf, namely the large extent to which it relied on support from political elites in the opposition party.

The Tea Party, a conservative force in American politics that began in 2009, is also a controversial example of astroturfing. Critics, notably including Former President Barack Obama and Speaker of the House Nancy Pelosi, dismissed the Tea Party as Astroturf. They say that the movement purports to represent large swaths of America when in reality it comes from a select few billionaires seeking policies favorable to themselves. The Tea Party has defended itself, arguing that it comes out of broad popular support and widespread anger at the Democratic Party and disenchantment with the GOP. Defenders of the Tea Party cite polls that find substantial support, indicating that the movement has some basis in grassroots politics. Critics point to the corporate influence on the Tea Party, which they believe indicates that the movement is more top-down than the grassroots rhetoric would suggest. The Tea Party can be considered grassroots to the extent that it comes from the people, but it is considered astroturfing to the extent that it is shaped by corporations and particularly wealthy individuals.

Current examples

 Earth Hour International - Created by WWF Australia and advertising agency Leo Burnett Sydney and Fairfax Media, has described itself as "the world's largest grass roots movement"
 Bernie Sanders presidential campaign, 2016: this has been deemed by some as a grassroots campaign because of its focus on small donations, massive rallies and other grassroots style politicking methods.
 Momentum in the United Kingdom: it has been described as a grassroots movement supportive of Jeremy Corbyn and the Labour Party.

Use in sport
The term "grassroots" is used by a number of sporting organizational bodies to reference the lowest, most elementary form of the game that anyone can play. Focusing on the grassroots of a sporting code can lead to greater participation numbers, greater support of professional teams/athletes and ultimately provide performance and financial benefits to the organization to invest into the growth and development of the sport. Some examples of this are FIFA's Grassroots Programme and the Football Federation Australia's "Goals for Grassroots" initiative.

See also
 Grassroots democracy
 Grassroots fundraising
 Grassroots lobbying

References

Further reading
 Ekins, Paul (1992.) A new world order: grassroots movements for global change. Routledge. 
 Fox, Jonathan A.; Brown David, L. (1998.) The struggle for accountability: the World Bank, NGOs, and grassroots movements. Massachusetts Institute of Tech.

External links

 The Citizen's Handbookguides to grassroots/community organizing

Political terminology of the United States
Community organizing
Activism

Political metaphors

ko:풀뿌리 민주주의